The Limba people are the third largest ethnic group in Sierra Leone. They represent 12.4% of Sierra Leone's total population (792,190 members). They are based in the north of the country across seven provinces, comprising about 12% of the national populations. They’re predominantly found in the Northern Province of Sierra Leone. 

The Limba are believed to be the earliest indigenous people of Sierra Leone. They speak a distinctive language that is unrelated to the other languages in Sierra Leone.

They are primarily found in the Northern Province, particularly in Bombali District, Koinadugu, Kambia District, Karene District and Tonkolili District but a small number are found in Guinea.

During Sierra Leone's colonial era, thousands of Limbas migrated to the capital city of Freetown and its Western Area. As a result, a significant number of Limbas can be found in Freetown and its surrounding Western Area.

During the 16th, 17th, and 18th century, many Limba people were shipped to North America as slaves.

The Limba are mainly rice farmers, traders, and hunters who live in the savannah-woodland region in the Northern Province of Sierra Leone.  They predominate in 16 of Sierra Leone's 190 rural chiefdoms in Sierra Leone, and their community affairs are dominated by the local paramount chiefs.

Major Limba Towns include: Bafodia, Wara-Wara Yagala Chiefdom, Kabala, Kamakwie, Binkolo, Kamabai, Madina, Fadugu, Kamasasa, Mabonto and Kamasigi.

History 
Members of the Limba tribe believe that they have always lived in Sierra Leone in the Wara Wara mountains and were probably the first rulers of the territory. Some historians believe that the Limba were living in Sierra Leone prior to colonialism.

They were also brilliant scholars and philosophers who brought their knowledge of agriculture and trade with them and with that built a society based on this sole ideal: If you work and respect the land properly, then you are worthy to enjoy the fruits of your labor.

During the colonial era, many Limba people were captured and sold at Bunce Island as slaves to the Americas through the Atlantic slave trade. To escape this, many Limba people traveled to the capital city of Freetown and the Western area, and as a result, most Limba are located in these places.

Culture
The Limba consider themselves to be a mountain people and have at points in their history found themselves pushed into the mountains, particularly during the periods of Susu expansionism.

Historically, they also had to fight off incursions from the Fula and the Mandinka people.

The Limba take pride in their unique language, which differs from the other languages spoken in Sierra Leone. As a result, Limbas strive to be very articulate with their vocabulary as a way of sticking out among the rest.

They are mostly rice farmers, palm wine brewers, and stone builders.

They also have a past and current interest in politics, for example Siaka Stevens as the first president of Sierra Leone from 1971 to 1985, Ernest Bai Koroma as the former president of Sierra Leone from 2007, Christian Alusine Kamara-Taylor as a founding member of the All People's Congress and Paolo Conteh, the former defense minister and Eric Dura Sesay as the Bombali district chairman.

According to folklore, Limbas make excellent political leaders because they are descendants of the original rulers of Sierra Leone. The Limba's primary sport of interest is soccer, which is quite common amongst nations in West Africa.

The Limba have a spiritual home called The Kakoya Village, Wara-Wara Bafodia Chiefdom, and they believe all Limbas return to the mountain through the town beyond a "door" through the rock. An ancient wooden figure discovered in a cave at The Kakoya Village was probably made by the Limba people. Now in the British Museum, it may have represented an ancestor or deity. They also have a folklore about spirits called Krifi, but information about this is limited.

The Limba people also utilize practices of the Bondo secret society which aims at gradually but firmly  establishing attitudes related to adulthood in girls, discussions on fertility, morality and proper sexual comportment. The society also maintains an interest in the well-being of its members throughout their lives.

Religion and spiritual beliefs

Christianity
The Limba in the southern province are mostly influenced by Christianity. Portuguese Christian missionary efforts began before the Protestant Reformation but had no lasting effects on the Temne. The Protestant presence accompanied the founding of Freetown in the late eighteenth century; Church Missionary Society representatives were active up the Rokel River and elsewhere in Temne country throughout the nineteenth century.

In the 1890s, the Soudna Mission was the first American mission in the Temne area; American Wesleyans and the Evangelical United Brethren subsequently joined the field. Today, 55% of Limba are followers of Christianity.

Islam
The Limba in the Northern Province are somewhat influenced by Islam. Muslim contacts probably go back several centuries, and fifteenth-century Portuguese were cognizant of Muslim peoples. Early traders, holy men, and warriors brought Islam into the Temne area from the north by the Susu and northeast by the Fula and Mandinka. Through the nineteenth century, as the volume of trade grew, Muslim influences increased; in the late twentieth century, a significant proportion of Temne claim to be Muslim converts.

Although 40% of Limba have converted to Islam, they still practice their traditional religion, as well.

Notable Limbas 

 Almamy Suluku, powerful Limba ruler who maintained his independence as long as possible through brilliant political strategy during the colonial era. (Kamabai - Northern Province)
 Siaka Stevens, president of Sierra Leone from 1971 to 1985
 Joseph Saidu Momoh, president of Sierra Leone from 1985 to 1992
 Christian Alusine Kamara-Taylor, Sierra Leonean politician and one of the founding members
Johnny Paul Koroma, Head of State of Sierra Leone from May 1997 to February 1998
 Ernest Bai Koroma, former president of Sierra Leone from 2007 to 2018
 Brima Acha Kamara, the former Inspector General of the Sierra Leone Police (SLP)
 Alfred Paolo Conteh, Current Sierra Leone's Minister of Defence
 John Sisay, Current Chief Executive Officer for Sierra Rutile

 Sanpha Bilo Kamara, Current Director of Prisons Department
 Eric Dura Sesay, Current Minister of State in the Office of the Vice President
Dauda Sulaiman Kamara, current Sierra Leone's Minister of Internal Affairs Minister and Rural Development
Moses Musa Sesay, Former mayor of Makeni
 Hon Dr. Thomas Mark Turay, former Member of parliament 
 Kandeh Baba Conteh, Sierra Leonean politician and leader of the Peace and Liberation Party (PLP)
 Almamy Kossie Dura, Prominent chief in the town of Binkolo
Peter Bayuku Conteh, Former Minister of Tourism and Cultural Affairs
Dr. David Soure Sesay, Order Of The Rokel Holder, Commander of Sierra Leone Gulf War Contingent, 1991
 Lamin Conteh, footballer
 Abdul Thompson Conteh, footballer
 Kewullay Conteh, footballer
 Rosemarie Kargbo, former Miss Africa Netherlands
 Sampha, UK musician
 Adama Delphine Fawundu
 Dembakwi Yomba
 James Bambay Kamara, former Inspector General of Sierra Leone Police from 1987 to 1992
 Jimmy Bangura, godfather of Sierra Leone 🇸🇱 Music Industry.

External links 
  Photos from the Limba Region
  Limba Masks
  Limba Music Recordings
  See section on "Alimamy Suluku", famous Limba ruler of the 19th century

References 

Ethnic groups in Sierra Leone
West African people
Female genital mutilation
Female genital mutilation by country